Indiadhanush is India cultural television show hosted by Siddharth Kak. Indiadhanush premiered on 31 March 2008. Indiadhanush Is Limited To Indian Traveling only.

Host 
Siddharth Kak ... Host
Ami Trivedi ... Co-host

External links 
Official Site
Decorations

2008 Indian television series debuts
Imagine TV original programming
Indian travel television series
Indian documentary television series